Kentucky Route 261 (KY 261) is a  state highway in Kentucky that runs from Kentucky Route 54 southeast of Fordsville to Kentucky Route 79 and Sandy Hill Road in rural Meade County southwest of Brandenburg via McQuady, Hardinsburg, and Webster.

Route description
KY 261 begins at a junction with KY 54 on the east side of Fordsville, located in northeastern Ohio County. It then traverses the southernmost tip of Hancock County. The highway intersects KY 2124, along with a few more rural state highways that connect this particular area to Hawesville, the county seat of Hancock County.

KY 261 enters Breckinridge County and then intersects KY 105 at McQuady. It meets U.S. Route 60 (US 60) and KY 259 in the Breckinridge County seat, Hardinsburg. The highway runs concurrently with KY 259 from the US 60 junction to downtown Hardinsburg. KY 261 turns away to traverse mainly rural areas of northeastern Breckinridge County. That section of the route also includes a stretch concurrent with KY 86.

KY 261 ends in Meade County at an intersection with KY 79 between Irvington and the Meade County seat of Brandenburg.

Major intersections

References

0261
0261
0261
0261
0261